Edrissa Sanneh (born 2 January 1951 in Brufut, Gambia), more commonly known as Idris, is a former Senegalese Disc jockey. Currently, he is a sports journalist.

Because of his passionate, enthusiastic and unique football commentary, Idris has become something of a celebrity in Italy. He's a Juventus F.C. fan.

References

External links

Cori razzisti, Idris: "Altro che daspo, questi deficienti vanno sterminati"

Living people
Senegalese television presenters
Italian television personalities
Senegalese emigrants to Italy
1951 births
Italian Muslims